The false argus skate (Dentiraja falloarga) is a species of skate of the family Rajidae native waters off northwestern Australia.

References 

Rajiformes
Marine fish of Southern Australia
Fish described in 2008
Taxa named by Peter R. Last